The following is the list of episodes of the American sitcom Titus as they are presented in U.S. broadcast order. The show ran on the Fox network for three seasons (2000–2002) airing 54 episodes; a two-part reunion episode/finale was livestreamed in 2020 and released in 2021 for paid download and viewing on Christopher Titus' website.

Series overview

Episodes

Season 1 (2000)

Season 2 (2000–01)

Season 3 (2001–02)

Season 4 (2020)

References

Lists of American sitcom episodes